Tim Boss (born 28 June 1993) is a German professional footballer who plays as goalkeeper for  club 1. FC Magdeburg.

Career
In his youth, Boss played for Bayer Leverkusen and Wuppertaler SV. In the 2012–13 season he transferred to the second team Fortuna Düsseldorf, playing in the Regionalliga West. In the summer of 2014 he moved to league rivals SG Wattenscheid 09. He played in all 34 matches of the 2014–15 season.

After just one season, in July 2015, he moved to 3. Liga side Fortuna Köln. There he made his debut on 28 August 2015 during the 2–1 home win over 1. FC Magdeburg on matchday 6 when he came on as a substitute in the 83rd minute for André Poggenborg.

On 18 June 2018, Dynamo Dresden announced they had signed Boss on a two-year contract, valid for the three upper classes of the German football league system. He left Dresden in 2020 for Wehen Wiesbaden.

In 2020, Boss signed with SV Wehen Wiesbaden.

On 9 June 2022, he joined 1. FC Magdeburg.

References

External links
 

Living people
1993 births
German footballers
Footballers from Cologne
Association football goalkeepers
Fortuna Düsseldorf II players
SG Wattenscheid 09 players
SC Fortuna Köln players
Dynamo Dresden players
SV Wehen Wiesbaden players
1. FC Magdeburg players
2. Bundesliga players
3. Liga players
Regionalliga players